Henry Genga (born December 8, 1939) is an American politician who has served in the Connecticut House of Representatives from the 10th district since 2006.

References

1939 births
Living people
Democratic Party members of the Connecticut House of Representatives
21st-century American politicians